A Fairy Tale is a game that was released by Reflexive Entertainment. A Fairy Tale was initially PC exclusive, however, it was later released on Nintendo DS. The game is a matching game that is similar to the popular match-3 video games, but is unique in its gameplay. The game follows the adventures of three young fairies journeying through the forest as they attempt to save their village from an evil menace. The game also features a running comedic story with tongue-in-cheek storyboards.

References

External links
 Official Reflexive Arcade site
 Official A Fairy Tale site

2009 video games
Reflexive Entertainment games
Classic Mac OS games
Video games developed in the United States
Windows games